Marcel Hitz (born 3 September 1974) is a Swiss former snowboarder. He competed in the men's halfpipe event at the 2002 Winter Olympics.

References

External links
 

1974 births
Living people
Swiss male snowboarders
Olympic snowboarders of Switzerland
Snowboarders at the 2002 Winter Olympics
People from Lucerne-Land District
Sportspeople from the canton of Lucerne